Enrico Pepe (born 12 November 1989) is a footballer who plays as a centre-back for Birkirkara. Born in Italy, he represents the Malta national team.

Club career
Pepe began his club career at Campobasso, during which he spent loan spells at Salernitana and Siracusa. In 2011, he moved to Siena and was subsequently loaned to Paganese, with the latter exercising their right to sign him permanently at the end of the season. He joined Messina in 2014, before moving to Malta to play for Floriana in 2015. He played for Ħamrun Spartans during the 2018–19 season, and joined Birkirkara in 2019.

International career
Pepe was awarded Maltese citizenship on sporting merit in August 2020, and was therefore eligible to appear for the Malta national team. He made his international debut on 6 September 2020 in the UEFA Nations League against Latvia.

Career statistics

International

References

External links
 
 
 
 Italian league statistics
 

1989 births
Living people
Sportspeople from the Province of Naples
People with acquired Maltese citizenship
Maltese footballers
Malta international footballers
Italian footballers
Maltese people of Italian descent
Association football central defenders
S.S.D. Città di Campobasso players
U.S. Salernitana 1919 players
A.S.D. Cassino Calcio 1924 players
U.S. Siracusa players
A.C.N. Siena 1904 players
Paganese Calcio 1926 players
A.C.R. Messina players
Floriana F.C. players
Ħamrun Spartans F.C. players
Birkirkara F.C. players
Serie C players
Serie B players
Maltese Premier League players
Footballers from Campania